Assam Agricultural University (AAU) is an agricultural education state university which was established on 1 April 1969 in Jorhat in the state of Assam, India. The jurisdiction of the university extends to the entire State of Assam with regard to teaching, research and extension education in the field of agriculture and allied sciences. The university has a number of campuses with its headquarters at Borbheta, Jorhat.

Colleges

The university has faculties and colleges all over Assam:
College of Agriculture, Jorhat
College of  Community Science, Jorhat
College of Veterinary Science, Khanapara
College of  Fishery Science, Raha
Biswanath College of Agriculture, Biswanath Chariali
Sarat Chandra Sinha College of Agriculture, Rangamati, Dhubri 
Lakhimpur College of Veterinary Science, North Lakhimpur
College of Horticulture, Nalbari (Currently functioning at Assam Agricultural University's Jorhat campus)
College of Sericulture, Titabor (Currently functioning at Assam Agricultural University's Jorhat campus)

Research stations

The university has six Regional Agricultural Research Stations in each agricultural zone of Assam at:
Titabar - Upper Brahmaputra Valley Zone
North Lakhimpur - North Bank Plain Zone
Shillongoni - Central Brahmaputra Valley Zone
Diphu - Hill Zone
Gossaigaon - Lower Brahmaputra Valley Zone
Karimganj - Barak Valley Zone

The university also has four Commodity Research Stations at:
Citrus Research Station, Tinsukia
Sugarcane Research Station, Buralikson
Horticulture Research Station, Kahikuchi
Goat Research Station, Burnihut

The university also has established Krishi Vigyan Kendras for extension purpose in all the districts of Assam.

Departments
Departments under the university's faculties are:

Faculty of Agriculture
Agronomy
Agroforestry
Agricultural Biotechnology
Agricultural Economics & Farm management
Agricultural Engineering
Agricultural Meteorology
Agricultural Statistics
Animal Husbandry & Dairying
Biochemistry & Agricultural Chemistry
Crop Physiology
Entomology
Extension Education
Farm Power, Machinery & Structure
Horticulture
Irrigation & Water Management
Nematology
Plant Breeding & Genetics
Plant Pathology
Soil Science
Tea Husbandry & Technology

Faculty of Veterinary Science
Animal Biotechnology
Animal Genetics & Breeding
Animal Nutrition
Animal Production & Management
Extension Education (Veterinary)
Veterinary Anatomy & Histology
Veterinary Gynaecology
Veterinary Medicine, Public Health & Hygiene
Veterinary Microbiology
Veterinary Parasitology
Veterinary Pathology
Veterinary Pharmacology & Toxicology
Veterinary Physiology
Veterinary Surgery & Radiology
Poultry Science & Dairy Science

Faculty of Community  Science
Human development and Family Studies
Textile Science and Apparel Designing
Extension Education and Communication Mgt.
Food Science & Nutrition
Family resource management

Faculty of Fisheries Science
Aquaculture
Fish Biology
Hydrography
Fish Technology & Engineering
Fish Extension Education
Fish Economics & Management

The university is the only educational centre in the world to offer a comprehensive four-year degree program in Agriculture with specialization in Tea Husbandry and Technology, which covers the entire gamut of tea cultivation, production and marketing. The Faculty of Agriculture offers B.Sc., M.Sc. and PhD degree programs. The Faculty of Home Science offers B.Sc. and M.Sc. degree programs in all departments and a Ph.D. degree program in Food and Nutrition only. Presently, the number of students enrolled in the first year B.V.Sc. & A.H. degree each year is 100 and enrolment capacity of each department in M.V.Sc. and Ph.D. degree programme is 10 and 4, respectively, in the Faculty of Veterinary Science.

References

External links
 

Universities in Assam
Agricultural universities and colleges in India
Jorhat
Education in Jorhat district
Agriculture in Assam
Educational institutions established in 1969
1969 establishments in Assam
State universities in Assam